Albert Béchard (November 18, 1922, in Saint-Alexis-de-Matapédia, Quebec, Canada – April 28, 2002) was a Canadian politician and notary. He was elected to the House of Commons of Canada as a Member of the Liberal Party in the 1962 election to represent the riding of Bonaventure. He was re-elected in the elections of 1963, 1965, 1968, 1972 and 1974, the latter two for the renamed riding of Bonaventure—Îles-de-la-Madeleine. During his federal political career, he served as Parliamentary Secretary to the Secretary of State (1966–1968), then Parliamentary Secretary to the Minister of Justice and Attorney General (1970–1972). He also served as Deputy Chair of Committees of the Whole (1968–1970). He also chaired the House of Commons Standing Committee on Fisheries and Forestry (1973–1977) and sat on numerous other committees including the joint committee Standing Committee on Regulations and other Statutory Instruments.

External links
 

1922 births
2002 deaths
Liberal Party of Canada MPs
Members of the House of Commons of Canada from Quebec